Annabelle Cleeland is an Australian politician who is the current member for the district of Euroa in the Victorian Legislative Assembly. She is a member of the Nationals and was elected in the 2022 state election, replacing retiring MLA Steph Ryan.

References 

Year of birth missing (living people)
Living people
Members of the Victorian Legislative Assembly
21st-century Australian women politicians
National Party of Australia members of the Parliament of Victoria
21st-century Australian politicians